Primax Broadcasting Network is a broadcast radio network in the Philippines. Its main office is located at 10th Floor, Jacinta Bldg. II, EDSA, Makati. The network is owned by the Yabut family (original owners of Nation Broadcasting Corporation prior to 1998).

MemoRieS FM is Primax's FM network of stations in Baguio and Cebu. Both are affiliated with RMN.

Primax Radio Stations

References

Mass media companies of the Philippines
Companies based in Makati
Mass media in Metro Manila
Mass media companies established in 1995
1995 establishments in the Philippines
Privately held companies of the Philippines